Macaroni is a 1985 Italian comedy-drama film directed by Ettore Scola. The film was selected as the Italian entry for the Best Foreign Language Film at the 58th Academy Awards, ahead of Federico Fellini's Ginger and Fred, but was not accepted as a nominee.

Plot
Jack Lemmon plays a successful, physically exhausted, pill-popping American businessman, going through a divorce, who visits Naples, Italy.  He spends several days there as a guest of a local business acquaintance, played by Marcello Mastroianni, who has a more laid-back philosophy and is devoted to his large family. In the process, Lemmon's character learns how to relax and live the good life.

Cast
 Marcello Mastroianni as Antonio Jasiello
Jack Lemmon (dubbed by Giuseppe Rinaldi) as Robert Traven
 Daria Nicolodi as Laura Di Falco
 Isa Danieli as Carmelina Jasiello
 Maria Luisa Santella as Door Keeper
 Patrizia Sacchi as Virginia
 Bruno Esposito as Giulio Jasiello
 Orsetta Gregoretti as Young actress in theater
 Marc Berman as French record producer
 Jean-François Perrier as French record producer
 Giovanna Sanfilippo as Maria
 Fabio Tenore as Pasqualino (the little monk)
 Marta Bifano as Luisella
 Aldo De Martino as Cottone (theater manager)
 Tilde De Spirito as The villain's mistress (as Clotilde De Spirito)

Reception
The film opened in the United States, distributed by Paramount Pictures, on 13 screens on 1 November 1985 and grossed $119,925 in its opening weekend.

See also
 List of submissions to the 58th Academy Awards for Best Foreign Language Film
 List of Italian submissions for the Academy Award for Best Foreign Language Film

References

External links

1985 films
1985 comedy films
1985 drama films
1980s buddy comedy-drama films
1980s Italian-language films
Italian buddy comedy-drama films
Films set in Naples
Films directed by Ettore Scola
Films with screenplays by Ruggero Maccari
Films scored by Armando Trovajoli
Films with screenplays by Ettore Scola
1980s Italian films